GNW may refer to:

 Genworth Financial, an international financial services organization
 Good News Week, an Australian television program
 Greenwich station, in London
 Gross National Well-being or Gross National Wellness
 Hansa-Brandenburg GNW, a floatplane
 Western Bolivian Guarani, a language of Bolivia